The INA War Museum or the Indian National Army War Museum is a WWII museum in Moirang, Manipur. It is the only official WWII museum in Manipur though many other WWII museums are opened in the state. This museum is situated inside the INA Memorial Complex. The museum focuses primarily on the rise of the Indian National Army (INA) and the contributions of Subhash Chandra Bose to the Indian independence movement. This museum is the only official museum dedicated to Netaji Subhash Chandra Bose.

History 
Moirang is the first place in Indian soil where the Indian national tricolour flag was hoisted. It was in this place where the INA War Museum and the INA Martyrs' Memorial Complex were developed. The INA War Museum was established in the year 1985. It was in tribute to Subhash Chandra Bose for his roles in the Indian Freedom Struggle.

Collections and features 
The Indian National Army War Museum displays artefacts and relics of WWII found from various locations in Manipur. These relics dating back to 1944 include arms and ammunition, bayonets, helmets and other documents. It also displays hundreds of rare photographs of Netaji Subhash Chandra Bose and the INA, maps, insignia, currency notes, Netaji's letters, INA badges and Japanese amulets.

Exhibits 
The INA museum exhibits a gallery of historical personalities of Manipur including Manipuri soldiers in the Indian National Army.

See also 
 Imphal Peace Museum
 Kakching Garden
 Keibul Lamjao National Park - world's only floating national park in Manipur, India
 Khonghampat Orchidarium
 Loktak Folklore Museum
 Manipur State Museum
 Manipur Zoological Garden
 Phumdi - Floating biomasses in Manipur, India
 Sekta Archaeological Living Museum
 Yangoupokpi-Lokchao Wildlife Sanctuary

References

External links 

 The INA War Museum www.museumsofindia.org 
 Ganesan pays floral tribute to Netaji INA soldiers www.pothashang.in
 Governor visits INA Museum www.pothashang.in
 INA flag hoisting anniversary observed at Moirang www.pothashang.in
 INA will be upgraded soon - CM www.pothashang.in
 Governor hoists National Flag INA www.pothashang.in
 President paid Homage Subhash Chandra Bose INA Moirang www.pothashang.in

Museums in Manipur
Museums in India
World War II museums